Pnai Plus (lit. Leisure Plus), or Pplus, is one of the major Israeli magazines published weekly that covers the world of entertainment and television worldwide as well as the local Israeli television and celebrities scene. Created in 1989 and owned by Yedioth Ahronoth, the magazine contains sections such as cinema, music, culture, and food.

History 

In September 2004, Pnai Plus published a two-page article about Madonna's Jewish faith.

In 2018, the readers of Pnai Plus named the rap sensation Dudu Faruk (Ori Comay) sexiest man in Israel.

References

External links
Pnai Plus homepage 

1989 establishments in Israel
Magazines established in 1989
Yedioth Ahronoth
Magazines published in Israel
Entertainment magazines
Celebrity magazines
Weekly magazines
Television magazines